D.A.Z. is the thirteenth studio album by rapper Daz Dillinger. It was released on April 19, 2011, through Gangsta Advisory Recordingz Inc.

Track listing

References

2011 albums
Daz Dillinger albums
Albums produced by Daz Dillinger